Brush turpentine is a common name for several Australian plants and may refer to:

Choricarpia leptopetala
Rhodamnia rubescens, native to Eastern Australia